Montarville is a provincial electoral district in the Montérégie region of Quebec, Canada that elects members to the National Assembly of Quebec. It consists of the municipalities of Boucherville and Saint-Bruno-de-Montarville, both of which are part of the urban agglomeration of Longueuil.

It was created for the 2012 election from parts of the Marguerite-D'Youville and Chambly electoral districts.

Marguerite-D'Youville, which ceased to exist, consisted of Boucherville and Sainte-Julie. To create Montarville, Sainte-Julie was moved to the Verchères electoral district and Saint-Bruno-de-Montarville was taken from Chambly.

Members of the National Assembly

Election results

|align="left" colspan=2 bgcolor="#FFFFFF"|Coalition Avenir Québec notional gain from Liberal
|align="right" colspan=2 bgcolor="#FFFFFF"|Swing
|align="right" bgcolor="#FFFFFF"| +18.43

^ Change based on redistributed results. CAQ change from ADQ.

References

External links
Information
 Elections Quebec

Election results
 Election results (National Assembly)
 Election results (QuébecPolitique)

Maps
 2011 map (PDF)
2001–2011 changes to Marguerite-D'Youville (Flash)
 Electoral map of Montérégie region
 Quebec electoral map, 2011

 

Quebec provincial electoral districts
Boucherville
Saint-Bruno-de-Montarville
2011 establishments in Quebec
Constituencies established in 2011